Wendelin Moosbrugger, or Mosbrugger (20 October 1760 in Au, Vorarlberg - 20 August 1849 in Aarau) was an Austrian portrait painter and miniaturist. He came from a family that had a widespread reputation as builders, plasterers and painters.

Life and work
As a child, he showed a special talent for drawing and painting. He received his first training in Konstanz and worked as a decorative painter. He attracted the attention of Elector Charles Frederick, while painting at the Electoral residence in Mannheim, and was enrolled at the recently established Palatine Academy. 

Although he lived in Konstanz after 1794, he was also active in Karlsruhe and Vienna, as well as at the court in Stuttgart. He also did portraits of the nobility in Cologne. Following the example of Napoleon, German princes flocked to have themselves immortalized in paint. He did, in fact, do a portrait of Napoleon's brother Jérôme, the King of Westphalia. In 1810, King Frederick I of Württemberg appointed him to be the court painter.

He died in Aarau, at the home of his son , a noted mathematician. His sons Friedrich and Joseph also became painters, and his son  was an architect.

References

Further reading 
 Michael Bringmann, Sigrid von Blanckenhagen: Die Mosbrugger. Die Konstanzer Maler Wendelin, Friedrich und Joseph Mosbrugger. Konrad, Weißenhorn 1974, 
 Die Konstanzer Maler Wendelin, Friedrich, Joseph Mosbrugger. Kunstverein Konstanz 1969

External links 

 
 Wendelin Moosbrugger @ the Vorarlberger Landesbibliothek

1760 births
1849 deaths
Austrian painters
Austrian male painters
Portrait painters